Ross Thomas Dwyer (July 20, 1919 – October 8, 2001) was a United States Marine Corps major general who retired in 1974 after over 32 years of service.  MajGen Dwyer served in combat in World War II, the Korean War, and in the Vietnam War. His commands included the 5th Marine Division and the 1st Marine Division.

Biography
Ross T. Dwyer was born in Honolulu, Hawaii, on July 20, 1919.  He graduated from Punahou School in Honolulu in 1937.  He studied economics at Stanford University where he was a member of the Chi Psi fraternity, earning his Bachelor of Arts degree in 1942. In 1941, while at Stanford, he joined the United States Marine Corps Reserve. He was commissioned a Marine Corps second lieutenant on September 26, 1942.

World War II
During World War II, Dwyer served as a 5-inch battery and machine gun officer with the Marine detachment aboard the USS South Dakota in both the European Theater of Operations and the Pacific Theater, participating in four major naval campaigns. After his sea duty, he became a tank instructor at Camp Pendleton, California.

Post-war
Immediately following the war, Dwyer returned to Hawaii as the commanding officer of the Marine Barracks, Naval Air Station (NAS) Kaneohe Bay and then at the Naval Air Facility (NAF) Johnson Islands (Pacific Ocean).  He next served briefly with the 2nd Marines as a company commander.

In February 1948,  he entered the Amphibious Warfare School, Junior Course, Marine Corps Schools, Quantico, Virginia. Upon graduation in August 1948, he joined the 2nd Marine Division where he served consecutively as a company commander with the 8th Marines and 6th Marines; as officer in charge (OIC), Division NCO School; S-3, 2nd Battalion, 6th Marines; and S-3, 2nd Battalion, 8th Marines. He was promoted to major in January 1951, and was transferred to Headquarters Marine Corps in June of that year, where he served as head, Enlisted Promotion Section, Personnel Department.

Korean War
In September 1952, Dwyer was ordered to Korea. During the Korean War, he served as executive officer (XO) of the  USMC Advisory Group to the 1st Korean Marine Corps Regiment; As S-3, 5th Marines; Assistant G-3 (Ops) and Assistant G-3 (Plans) for the 1st Marine Division.

After Korea
Dwyer returned to the States in August 1953 and served for two years as an aide to the Joint Chiefs of Staff.  In December 1955, he was promoted to lieutenant colonel.

From 1955 to 1958, Dwyer served as an instructor at Marine Corps Schools, Ouantico, followed by a tour of duty in London on the staff of CINCNELM/CINCUSNAVEUR, After attending the Armed Forces Staff College, he joined the 2nd Marine Division and assumed command of the 2nd Battalion, 6th Marines as Assistant Force Marine Officer, Amphibious Plans and operations officer. While in this assignment he participated in contingency operations in Lebanon in 1958. He was deployed to the U.S. 6th Fleet as commander, Task Force 62 (Landing Force) and later was deployed as the commanding officer, Battalion Landing Team (BLT) 2/6 during the Cuban contingency operations.

In December 1962, LtCol Dwyer became Asst G-1 of the 2nd Marine Division. Ordered overseas in June 1963, he joined the 1st Marine Aircraft Wing (1st MAW) in Japan as Assistant G-1, later becoming G-1. While serving in this capacity, he was promoted to colonel in July 1964.

He returned to U.S. in July 1964.  From  September 1, 1964, to late January 1965, was assigned as head, Western Region Team, Joint Plans Group, DC/s, Plans and Programs, at Headquarters Marine Corps. From February 1965 to June 1967, Dwyer served as USMC Aide to the Secretary of the Navy (SecNav).  In May 1968, Col Dwyer graduated from the National War College, Washington, D.C.

Vietnam War

In June 1968, Dwyer reported to the Republic of Vietnam, and was assigned as the CO, 1st Marines, 1st Marine Division (Reinforced), FMF. He was promoted to brigadier general on August 14, 1968, and subsequently served as assistant division commander, 1st Marine Division; Commanding General (CG) Task Force Yankee, 1st Marine Division; and finally as G-3, III Marine Amphibious Force.

Post-Vietnam
Following his return to the States in late June 1969, Dwyer commanded the 5th Marine Division until it was deactivated in December 1969.  He then commanded the 5th Marine Expeditionary Brigade, which was redesignated the 5th Marine Amphibious Brigade on September 1, 1967.

On April 30, 1971, Dwyer became commanding general of 1st Marine Division at Camp Pendleton, California, and also assumed additional duties as commanding general of I Marine Amphibious Force. Dwyer was promoted to major general in August 1971.

After leaving the 1st Marine Division on August 10, 1972, he served as deputy director, Joint Staff, Joint Chiefs of Staff, Washington, D.C., until February 1973, when he became deputy commander, Fleet Marine Force, Atlantic. He received a second gold star in lieu of a third award of the Legion of Merit upon his retirement on September 1, 1974.

Dwyer died on October 8, 2001, at the age of 82.

Awards
His personal decorations include:

See also

1st Marine Division
5th Marine Division

My name is S. Dwyer. Although I cannot speak personally about his military accomplishments, GrandPa Ross was an absolutely incredible grandfather. Our family misses him dearly.

Notes

References

1919 births
2001 deaths
United States Marine Corps generals
United States Marine Corps personnel of World War II
United States Marine Corps personnel of the Korean War
United States Marine Corps personnel of the Vietnam War
Recipients of the Navy Distinguished Service Medal
Recipients of the Legion of Merit
Recipients of the Gallantry Cross (Vietnam)
People from Honolulu
Punahou School alumni
Stanford University alumni
Military personnel from Hawaii